Bi'an Township is a township in Jinggu Dai and Yi Autonomous County, Yunnan, China.

Administrative division
As of 2016, the town is divided into sixteen villages:
Mengzhu
Qiande
Guangming
Dazhai
Mangjing
Guoda
Xiben
Manhe
Bianjiang
Pingzhang
Wenming
Hetou
Shangzhai
Yaofang
Yunzhong
Huangcaoling

History
The township formerly known as "Biling Township". After the establishment of the Communist State, in 1950, Anle Township was merged into and it was renamed "Bi'an Township".

Geography
The township is situated at southwestern Jinggu Dai and Yi Autonomous County. It is surrounded by Yongping Town on the north, Mengban Township and Lancang Lahu Autonomous County on the west, Yizhi Township on the east, and Simao District on the south.

There are three rivers in the township, namely the Weiyuan River, Xiaohei River, and Lancang River.

Economy
The township's economy is based on nearby mineral resources and agricultural resources. Tobacco, tea, and walnut are the economic plants of this region. The region abounds with iron and copper.

Demographics

As of 2020, the National Bureau of Statistics of China estimates the township's population now to be 23,279.

References

Bibliography

Divisions of Jinggu Dai and Yi Autonomous County